In geometry, Routh's theorem determines the ratio of areas between a given triangle and a triangle formed by the pairwise intersections of three cevians.
 
where  is the area of the triangle .

This theorem was given by Edward John Routh on page 82 of his Treatise on Analytical Statics with Numerous Examples in 1896. The particular case  has become popularized as the one-seventh area triangle. The  case implies that the three medians are concurrent (through the centroid).

Proof

Suppose that the area of triangle  is 1. For triangle  and line  using Menelaus's theorem, We could obtain:

Then 
So the area of triangle  is:

Similarly, we could know:  and 
Thus the area of triangle  is:

Citations 
The citation commonly given for Routh's theorem is Routh's Treatise on Analytical Statics with Numerous Examples, Volume 1, Chap. IV, in the second edition of 1896
p. 82, possibly because that edition has been easier to hand. However, Routh gave the theorem already in the first edition of 1891, Volume 1, Chap. IV, p. 89. Although there is a change in pagination between the editions, the wording of the relevant footnote remained the same.

Routh concludes his extended footnote with a caveat:
"The author has not met with these expressions for the areas of two triangles that often occur. He has therefore placed them here in order that the argument in the text may be more easily understood."

Presumably, Routh felt those circumstances had not changed in the five years between editions. On the other hand, the title of Routh's book had been used earlier by Isaac Todhunter; both had been coached by William Hopkins.

Although Routh published the theorem in his book,  that is not the first published statement.  It is stated and proved as rider (vii) on page 33 of Solutions of the Cambridge Senate-house Problems and Riders for the Year 1878, i.e., the mathematical tripos of that year, and the link is https://archive.org/details/solutionscambri00glaigoog.  It is stated that the author of the problems with roman numerals is Glaisher.
Routh was a famous Mathematical Tripos coach when his book came out and was surely familiar with the content of the 1878 tripos examination.  Thus, his statement The author has not met with these expressions for the areas of two triangles that often occur.  is puzzling.

Problems in this spirit have a long history in recreational mathematics and mathematical paedagogy, perhaps one of the oldest instances of being the determination of the proportions of the fourteen regions of the Stomachion board. With Routh's Cambridge in mind, the one-seventh-area triangle, associated in some accounts with Richard Feynman, shows up, for example, as Question 100, p. 80, in Euclid's Elements of Geometry (Fifth School Edition), by Robert Potts (1805--1885,) of Trinity College, published in 1859; compare also his Questions 98, 99, on the same page. Potts stood twenty-sixth Wrangler in 1832 and then, like Hopkins and Routh, coached at Cambridge. Pott's expository writings in geometry were recognized by a medal at the International Exhibition of 1862, as well as by an Hon. LL.D. from the College of William and Mary, Williamsburg, Virginia.

References 
 Murray S. Klamkin and A. Liu (1981) "Three more proofs of Routh's theorem", Crux Mathematicorum 7:199–203.
 H. S. M. Coxeter (1969) Introduction to Geometry, statement p. 211, proof pp. 219–20, 2nd edition, Wiley, New York.
 J. S. Kline and D. Velleman (1995) "Yet another proof of Routh's theorem" (1995) Crux Mathematicorum 21:37–40
 Ivan Niven (1976) "A New Proof of Routh's Theorem", Mathematics Magazine 49(1): 25–7, 
 Jay Warendorff, Routh's Theorem, The Wolfram Demonstrations Project. 
 
 Routh's Theorem by Cross Products at MathPages
 Ayoub, Ayoub B. (2011/2012) "Routh's theorem revisited", Mathematical Spectrum 44 (1): 24-27.

Theorems about triangles
Area
Affine geometry